The 2012 Minnesota Twins season was the 52nd season for the franchise in Minnesota, and the 112th overall in the American League. The Twins wound up with a 66-96 record, 5th (last) place in the AL Central.

Regular season

On May 2, the Twins were no-hit for the fifth time in their history.  Jered Weaver of the Anaheim Angels threw 121 pitches, striking out nine, walking one and allowing no hits.  Four of the Twins' no-hit losses have occurred in California.  Two of the no-hitters were perfect games (Catfish Hunter, 1968 and David Wells, 1998).

Joe Mauer is the lone Minnesota selection to the All-Star Game, played July 10 in Kauffman Stadium.  As a reserve catcher, he enters the game in the top of the eighth as a replacement first baseman and goes 1 for 1 with a single.

On September 8, the Twins retired former manager Tom Kelly's number '10'.  He is the seventh Twin so honored, joining Harmon Killebrew (3), Rod Carew (29), Tony Oliva (6), Kent Hrbek (14), Kirby Puckett (34) and Bert Blyleven (28).  The number '42' is retired across all of the major leagues in honor of Jackie Robinson.

Outfielder Josh Willingham wins the Silver Slugger Award for the only time in his career.

Season standings

American League Central

American League Wild Card

Record vs. opponents

Game log 

|-  style="text-align:center; background:#fbb;"
| 1 || April 6 || @ Orioles || 2–4 || Arrieta (1–0) || Pavano (0–1) || Johnson (1) || 46,773 || 0–1
|-  style="text-align:center; background:#fbb;"
| 2 || April 7 || @ Orioles || 2–8 || Hunter (1–0) || Liriano (0–1) || || 31,532 || 0–2
|-  style="text-align:center; background:#fbb;"
| 3 || April 8 || @ Orioles || 1–3 || Hammel (1–0) || Swarzak (0–1) || Johnson (2) || 14,738 || 0–3
|-  style="text-align:center; background:#fbb;"
| 4 || April 9 || Angels || 1–5 || Wilson (1–0) || Blackburn (0–1) || || 39,414 || 0–4
|-  style="text-align:center; background:#bfb;"
| 5 || April 11 || Angels || 6–5 || Gray (1–0) || Takahashi (0–1) || Capps (1) || 31,413 || 1–4
|-  style="text-align:center; background:#bfb;"
| 6 || April 12 || Angels || 10–9 || Gray (2–0) || Thompson (0–1) || Capps (2) || 31,782 || 2–4
|-  style="text-align:center; background:#fbb;"
| 7 || April 13 || Rangers || 1–4 || Harrison (2–0) || Swarzak (0–2) || Ogando || 31,400 || 2–5
|-  style="text-align:center; background:#fbb;"
| 8 || April 14 || Rangers || 2–6 || Ross (1–0) || Duensing (0–1) || || 35,854 || 2–6
|-  style="text-align:center; background:#fbb;"
| 9 || April 15 || Rangers || 3–4 || Ross (2–0) || Perkins (0–1) || Nathan (3) || 32,093 || 2–7
|-  style="text-align:center; background:#bfb;"
| 10 || April 16 || @ Yankees || 7–3 || Pavano (1–1) || García (0–1) || || 40,218 || 3–7
|-  style="text-align:center; background:#fbb;"
| 11 || April 17 || @ Yankees || 3–8 || Sabathia (1–0) || Liriano (0–2) || || 40,194 || 3–8
|-  style="text-align:center; background: #bfb;"
| 12 || April 18 || @ Yankees || 6–5 || Marquis (1–0) || Kuroda (1–2) || Capps (3) || 36,831 || 4–8
|-  style="text-align:center; background:#fbb;"
| 13 || April 19 || @ Yankees || 6–7 || Hughes (1–2) || Swarzak (0–3) || Rivera (3) || 40,327 || 4–9
|-  style="text-align:center; background:#bfb;"
| 14 || April 20 || @ Rays || 5–4 || Maloney (1-0) || Gomes (0–1) || Capps (4) || 18,763 || 5–9
|-  style="text-align:center; background:#fbb;"
| 15 || April 21 || @ Rays || 1–4 || Shields (3–0) || Pavano (1–2) || Rodney (5) || 31,774  || 5–10
|-  style="text-align:center; background:#fbb;"
| 16 || April 22 || @ Rays || 2–6 || Niemann (1–2) || Liriano (0–3) || || 26,507 || 5–11
|-  style="text-align:center; background:#fbb;"
| 17 || April 23 || Red Sox || 5–6 || Bard (1–2) || Capps (0–1) || Aceves (3) || 32,351 || 5–12
|-  style="text-align:center; background:#fbb;"
| 18 || April 24 || Red Sox || 2–11 || Beckett (2–2) || Blackburn (0–2) || || 33,651 || 5–13
|-  style="text-align:center; background:#fbb;"
| 19 || April 25 || Red Sox || 6–7 || Buchholz (2–1) || Hendriks (0–1) || Aceves (4) || 32,254 || 5–14
|-  style="text-align:center; background:#fbb;"
| 20 || April 27 || Royals || 6–7 || Mijares (1–1) || Duensing (0–2) || Broxton (3) || 33,315 || 5–15
|-  style="text-align:center; bgcolor="bbbbbb"
|    || April 28 || Royals ||colspan=7|Postponed (rain); Makeup: 6/30
|-  style="text-align:center; background:#bfb;"
| 21 || April 29 || Royals || 7–4 || Marquis (2–0) || Chen (0–3) || || 34,201 || 6–15
|-  style="text-align:center; background:#fbb;"
| 22 || April 30 || @ Angels || 3–4 || Wilson (3–2) || Blackburn (0–3) || Downs (2) || 27,027 || 6–16
|-

|-  style="text-align:center; background:#fbb;"
| 23 || May 1 || @ Angels || 0–4 || Williams (2–1) || Liriano (0–4) || || 30,039 || 6–17
|-  style="text-align:center; background:#fbb;"
| 24 || May 2 || @ Angels || 0–9 || Weaver† (4–0) || Hendriks (0–2) || || 27,288 || 6–18
|-  style="text-align:center; background:#bfb;"
| 25 || May 4 || @ Mariners || 3–2 || Pavano (2–2) || Wilhelmsen (1–1) || Capps (5) || 22,492 || 7–18
|-  style="text-align:center; background:#fbb;"
| 26 || May 5 || @ Mariners || 0–7 || Hernández (3–1) || Marquis (2–1) || || 28,437 || 7–19
|-  style="text-align:center; background:#fbb;"
| 27 || May 6 || @ Mariners || 2–5 || Noesí (2–3) || Blackburn (0–4) || || 23,913 || 7–20
|-  style="text-align:center; background:#fbb;"
| 28 || May 7 || Angels || 3–8 || Weaver (5–0) || Liriano (0–5) || || 31,382 || 7–21
|-  style="text-align:center; background:#bfb;"
| 29 || May 8 || Angels || 5–0 || Diamond (1–0) || Haren (1–3) || || 30,776 || 8–21
|-  style="text-align:center; background:#fbb;"
| 30 || May 9 || Angels || 2–6 || Santana (1–6) || Pavano (2–3) || || 31,915 || 8–22
|-  style="text-align:center; background:#fbb;"
| 31 || May 10 || Blue Jays || 2–6 || Álvarez (3–2) || Marquis (2–2) || || 31,438 || 8–23
|-  style="text-align:center; background:#bfb;"
| 32 || May 11 || Blue Jays || 7–6 || Blackburn (1–4) || Drabek (2–4) || Capps (6) || 33,387 || 9–23
|-  style="text-align:center; background:#fbb;"
| 33 || May 12 || Blue Jays || 1–2 || Hutchison (2–1) || Walters (0–1) || Janssen (2) || 38,820 || 9–24
|-  style="text-align:center; background:#bfb;"
| 34 || May 13 || Blue Jays || 4–3 || Diamond (2–0) || Romero (4–1) || Capps (7) || 36,889 || 10–24
|-  style="text-align:center; background:#fbb;"
| 35 || May 14 || Indians || 4–5 || Smith (3–1) || Capps (0–2) || C. Perez (12) || 32,313 || 10–25
|-  style="text-align:center; background:#fbb;"
| 36 || May 15 || Indians || 0–5 || Lowe (6–1) || Marquis (2–3) || || 35,732 || 10–26
|-  style="text-align:center; background:#bfb;"
| 37 || May 16 || @ Tigers || 11–7 || Burnett (1–0) || Below (2–1) || || 33,955 || 11–26
|-  style="text-align:center; background:#bfb;"
| 38 || May 17 || @ Tigers || 4–3 || Walters (1–1) || Fister (0–2) || Capps (8) || 37,840 || 12–26
|-  style="text-align:center; background:#bfb;"
| 39 || May 18 || @ Brewers || 11–3 || Diamond (3–0) || Estrada (0–3) || || 32,421 || 13–26
|-  style="text-align:center; background:#bfb;"
| 40 || May 19 || @ Brewers || 5–4 (11) || Gray (3–0) || Parra (0–1) || Capps (9) || 42,398 || 14–26
|-  style="text-align:center; background:#fbb;"
| 41 || May 20 || @ Brewers || 4–16 || Greinke (5–1) || Marquis (2–4) || || 33,064 || 14–27
|-  style="text-align:center; background:#bfb;"
| 42 || May 22 || @ White Sox || 9–2 || Walters (2–1) || Floyd (3–5) || || 20,026 || 15–27
|-  style="text-align:center; background:#fbb;"
| 43 || May 23 || @ White Sox || 0–6 || Sale (5–2) || Diamond (3–1) || || 20,064 || 15–28
|-  style="text-align:center; background:#fbb;"
| 44 || May 24 || @ White Sox || 8–11 || Jones (2–0) || De Vries (0–1) || || 20,167 || 15–29
|-  style="text-align:center; background:#fbb;"
| 45 || May 25 || Tigers || 6–10 || Smyly (2–1) || Swarzak (0–4) || || 37,688 || 15–30
|-  style="text-align:center; background:#fbb;"
| 46 || May 26 || Tigers || 3–6 || Scherzer (4–3) || Pavano (2–4) || Valverde (8) || 37,360 || 15–31
|-  style="text-align:center; background:#fbb;"
| 47 || May 27 || Tigers || 3–4 || Villarreal (1–0) || Capps (0–3) || Valverde (9) || 38,710 || 15–32
|-  style="text-align:center; background:#bfb;"
| 48 || May 28 || Athletics || 5–4 || Burnett (2–0) || Cook (1–1) || Capps (10) || 34,709 || 16–32
|-  style="text-align:center; background:#bfb;"
| 49 || May 29 || Athletics || 3–2 || Perkins (1–1) || Fuentes (2–1) || || 31,781 || 17–32
|-  style="text-align:center; background:#bfb;"
| 50 || May 30 || Athletics || 4–0 || Liriano (1–5) || Ross (2–6) || || 35,103 || 18–32
|-

|-  style="text-align:center; background:#fbb;"
| 51 || June 1 || @ Indians || 1–7 || Lowe (7–3) || Pavano (2–5) || || 19,904 || 18–33
|-  style="text-align:center; background:#bfb;"
| 52 || June 2 || @ Indians || 7–4 || Duensing (1–2) || Tomlin (2–3) || Capps (11) || 25,469 || 19–33
|-  style="text-align:center; background:#bfb;"
| 53 || June 3 || @ Indians || 6–3 || Diamond (4–1) || Masterson (2–5) || Capps (12) || 21,238 || 20–33
|-  style="text-align:center; background:#bfb;"
| 54 || June 4 || @ Royals || 10–7 || De Vries (1–1) || Smith (1–2) || Capps (13) || 16,531 || 21–33
|-  style="text-align:center; background:#fbb;"
| 55 || June 5 || @ Royals || 0–1 || Chen (5–5) || Liriano (1–6) || Broxton (14) || 23,934 || 21–34
|-  style="text-align:center; background:#bfb;"
| 56 || June 6 || @ Royals || 4–2 || Blackburn (2–4) || Mendoza (2–3) || Capps (14) || 18,386 || 22–34
|-  style="text-align:center; background:#bfb;"
| 57 || June 8 || Cubs || 8–7 (10) || Capps (1–3) || Camp (2–3) || || 38,014 || 23–34
|-  style="text-align:center; background:#bfb;"
| 58 || June 9 || Cubs || 11–3 || Diamond (5–1) || Samardzija (5–4) || || 39,309 || 24–34
|-  style="text-align:center; background:#fbb;"
| 59 || June 10 || Cubs || 2–8 || Dempster (2–3) || Liriano (1–7) || || 37,526 || 24–35
|-  style="text-align:center; background:#bfb;"
| 60 || June 12 || Phillies || 11–7 || Blackburn (3–4) || Kendrick (2–6) || || 32,622 || 25–35
|-  style="text-align:center; background:#fbb;"
| 61 || June 13 || Phillies || 8–9 || Hamels (9–3) || Walters (2–2) || Papelbon (17) || 32,581 || 25–36
|-  style="text-align:center; background:#fbb;"
| 62 || June 14 || Phillies || 1–6 || Blanton (6–6) || Diamond (5–2) || || 32,205 || 25–37
|-  style="text-align:center; background:#fbb;"
| 63 || June 15 || Brewers || 3–5 || Loe (3–2) || Capps (1–4) || Axford (11) || 37,295 || 25–38
|-  style="text-align:center; background:#fbb;"
| 64 || June 16 || Brewers || 2–6 || Fiers (2–2) || Hendriks (0–3) || || 37,698 || 25–39
|-  style="text-align:center; background:#bfb;"
| 65 || June 17 || Brewers || 5–4 (15) || Swarzak (1–4) || Dillard (0–2) || || 39,206 || 26–39
|-  style="text-align:center; background:#fbb;"
| 66 || June 19 || @ Pirates || 2–7 || Correia (3–6) || Diamond (5–3) || || 19,936 || 26–40
|-  style="text-align:center; background:#bfb;"
| 67 || June 20 || @ Pirates || 2–1 || Burton (1–0) || Grilli (1–2) || Perkins (1) || 19,878 || 27–40
|-  style="text-align:center; background:#fbb;"
| 68 || June 21 || @ Pirates || 1–9 || McDonald (6–3) || Hendriks (0–4) || || 21,563 || 27–41
|-  style="text-align:center; background:#bfb;"
| 69 || June 22 || @ Reds || 5–4 || Blackburn (4–4) || Bailey (5–5) || Perkins (2) || 33,531 || 28–41
|-  style="text-align:center; background:#fbb;"
| 70 || June 23 || @ Reds || 0–6 || Cueto (9–3) || Duensing (1–3) || || 41,750 || 28–42
|-  style="text-align:center; background:#bfb;"
| 71 || June 24 || @ Reds || 4–3 || Diamond (6–3) || Chapman (4–4) || Burton (1) || 34,513 || 29–42
|-  style="text-align:center; background:#bfb;"
| 72 || June 25 || White Sox || 4–1 || Liriano (2–7) || Peavy (6–4) || Burton (2) || 35,695 || 30–42
|-  style="text-align:center; background:#fbb;"
| 73 || June 26 || White Sox || 2–3 || Floyd (6–7) || Hendriks (0–5) || Reed (10) || 35,102 || 30–43
|-  style="text-align:center; background:#fbb;"
| 74 || June 27 || White Sox || 5–12 || Sale (9–2) || Blackburn (4–5) || || 36,539 || 30–44
|-  style="text-align:center; background:#fbb;"
| 75 || June 29 || Royals || 3–4 || Mendoza (3–4) || Duensing (1–4) || Broxton (20) || 33,359 || 30–45
|-  style="text-align:center; background:#bfb;"
| 76 || June 30 || Royals || 7–2 || Diamond (7–3) || Sánchez (1–4) || || 37,694 || 31–45
|-  style="text-align:center; background:#bfb;"
| 77 || June 30 || Royals || 5–1 || De Vries (2–1) || Hochevar (5–8) || || 37,629 || 32–45
|-

|-  style="text-align:center; background:#bfb;"
| 78 || July 1 || Royals || 10–8 || Gray (4–0)  || Chen (7–7) || || 37,819 || 33–45
|-  style="text-align:center; background:#bfb;"
| 79 || July 2 || @ Tigers || 6–4 || Swarzak (2–4) || Fister (1–6) || Perkins (3) || 37,406 || 34–45
|-  style="text-align:center; background:#bfb;"
| 80 || July 3 || @ Tigers || 8–6 || Gray (5–0) || Villarreal (3–2) || Perkins (4) || 36,757 || 35–45
|-  style="text-align:center; background:#fbb;"
| 81 || July 4 || @ Tigers || 1–5 || Verlander (9–5) || Duensing (1–5) || || 41,023 || 35–46
|-  style="text-align:center; background:#fbb;"
| 82 || July 5 || @ Tigers || 3–7 || Dotel (2–2) || Burnett (2–1) || || 33,350 || 35–47
|-  style="text-align:center; background:#bfb;"
| 83 || July 6 || @ Rangers || 5–1 || Liriano (3–7) || Pérez (1–1) || || 47,240 || 36–47
|-  style="text-align:center; background:#fbb;"
| 84 || July 7 || @ Rangers || 3–4 (10) || Nathan (1–2) || Waldrop (0–1) || || 47,067 || 36–48
|-  style="text-align:center; background:#fbb;"
| 85 || July 8 || @ Rangers || 3–4 (13) || Feldman (3–6) || Burnett (2–2) || || 43,268 || 36–49
|-  style="text-align:center; background:#bbb;"
| colspan="9"  | All-Star Break: National League defeats American League 8–0.
|-  style="text-align:center; background:#fbb;"
| 86 || July 13 || Athletics || 3–6 || Griffin (1–0) || Liriano (3–8) || Cook (9) || 33,230 || 36–50
|-  style="text-align:center; background:#fbb;"
| 87 || July 14 || Athletics || 3–9 || Milone (9–6) || De Vries (2–2) || || 39,084 || 36–51
|-  style="text-align:center; background:#fbb;"
| 88 || July 15 || Athletics || 4–9 || Parker (6–4) || Duensing (1–6) || || 36,853 || 36–52
|-  style="text-align:center; background:#bfb;"
| 89 || July 16 || Orioles || 19–7 || Diamond (8–3) || Tillman (1–1) || || 32,445 || 37–52
|-  style="text-align:center; background:#bfb;"
| 90 || July 17 || Orioles || 6–4 || Burnett (3–2) || Ayala (2–3) || Burton (3) || 32,202 || 38–52
|-  style="text-align:center; background:#fbb;"
| 91 || July 18 || Orioles || 1–2 || Hunter (4–4) || Liriano (3–9) || Johnson (27) || 33,195 || 38–53
|-  style="text-align:center; background:#fbb;"
| 92 || July 19 || Orioles || 3–4 || Chen (8–5) || Burnett (3–3) || Johnson (28) || 37,676 || 38–54
|-  style="text-align:center; background:#bfb;"
| 93 || July 20 || @ Royals || 2–1 (11)|| Fien (1–0) || Broxton (1–2) || Perkins (5)|| 25,719 || 39–54
|-  style="text-align:center; background:#fbb;"
| 94 || July 21 || @ Royals || 3–7 || Mendoza (4–6) || Diamond (8–4) || Crow (2) || 26,747 || 39–55
|-  style="text-align:center; background:#bfb;"
| 95 || July 22 || @ Royals || 7–5 || Deduno (1–0) || Guthrie (3–10) || || 23,252 || 40–55
|-  style="text-align:center; background:#fbb;"
| 96 || July 23 || @ White Sox || 4–7 || Floyd (8–8) || Liriano (3–10) || Reed (16) || 37,788 || 40–56
|-  style="text-align:center; background:#fbb;"
| 97 || July 24 || @ White Sox || 4–11 || Jones (4–0) || Fien (1–1) || || 34,715 || 40–57
|-  style="text-align:center; background:#fbb;"
| 98 || July 25 || @ White Sox || 2–8 || Peavy (8–7) || Blackburn (4–6) || || 32,261 || 40–58
|-  style="text-align:center; background:#bfb;"
| 99 || July 27 || Indians || 11–0 || Diamond (9–4) || Tomlin (5–8) || || 37,820 || 41–58
|-  style="text-align:center; background:#bfb;"
| 100 || July 28 || Indians || 12–5 || Deduno (2–0) || Masterson (7–9) || || 39,166 || 42–58
|-  style="text-align:center; background:#bfb;"
| 101 || July 29 || Indians || 5–1 || Duensing (2–6) || Jiménez (8–10) || || 34,720 || 43–58
|-  style="text-align:center; background:#bfb;"
| 102 || July 30 || White Sox || 7–6 || Perkins (2–1) || Myers (0–5) || || 35,018 || 44–58
|-  style="text-align:center; background:#fbb;"
| 103 || July 31 || White Sox || 3–4 || Thornton (3–6) || Gray (5–1) || Reed (17) || 36,424 || 44–59
|-

|-  style="text-align:center; background:#fbb;"
| 104 || August 1 || White Sox || 2–3 || Peavy (9–7) || Diamond (9–5) || Reed (18) || 34,823 || 44–60
|-  style="text-align:center; background:#bfb;"
| 105 || August 2 || @ Red Sox || 5–0 || Deduno (3–0) || Lester (5–9) || Perkins (6) || 37,191 || 45–60
|-  style="text-align:center; background:#bfb;"
| 106 || August 3 || @ Red Sox || 6–5 (10) || Gray (6–1) || Padilla (4–1) || Burton (4) || 37,285 || 46–60
|-  style="text-align:center; background:#bfb;"
| 107 || August 4 || @ Red Sox || 6–4 || Burnett (4–3) || Aceves (2–7) || Burton (5) || 37,914 || 47–60
|-  style="text-align:center; background:#fbb;"
| 108 || August 5 || @ Red Sox || 4–6 || Morales (3–2) || Blackburn (4–7) || Aceves (23) || 37,019 || 47–61
|-  style="text-align:center; background:#bfb;"
| 109 || August 6 || @ Indians || 14–3 || Diamond (10–5) || McAllister (4–4) || || 18,775 || 48–61
|-  style="text-align:center; background:#bfb;"
| 110 || August 7 || @ Indians || 7–5 || Robertson (1–0) || Perez (0–4) || Perkins (7) || 14,813 || 49–61
|-  style="text-align:center; background:#fbb;"
| 111 || August 8 || @ Indians || 2–6 || Masterson (8–10) || Duensing (2–7) || || 18,805 || 49–62
|-  style="text-align:center; background:#fbb;"
| 112 || August 10 || Rays || 6–12 || Hellickson (7–7) || De Vries (2–3) || || 38,108 || 49–63
|-  style="text-align:center; background:#fbb;"
| 113 || August 11 || Rays || 2–4 || Price (15–4) || Blackburn (4–8) || Rodney (35) || 39,512 || 49–64
|-  style="text-align:center; background:#fbb;"
| 114 || August 12 || Rays || 3–7 (10) || Farnsworth (1–3) || Burnett (4–4) || Rodney (36) || 35,327 || 49–65
|-  style="text-align:center; background:#bfb;"
| 115 || August 13 || Tigers || 9–3 || Deduno (4–0) || Sánchez (6–10) || || 34,366 || 50–65
|-  style="text-align:center; background:#fbb;"
| 116 || August 14 || Tigers || 4–8 || Fister (7–7) || Duensing (2–8) || || 37,544 || 50–66
|-  style="text-align:center; background:#fbb;"
| 117 || August 15 || Tigers || 1–5 || Scherzer (12–6) || De Vries (2–4) || || 37,118 || 50–67
|-  style="text-align:center; background:#fbb;"
| 118 || August 17 || @ Mariners || 3–5 || Iwakuma (4–3) || Blackburn (4–9) || Wilhelmsen (17) || 22,602 || 50–68
|-  style="text-align:center; background:#fbb;"
| 119 || August 18 || @ Mariners || 2–3 || Wilhelmsen (4–2) || Robertson (1–1) || || 21,154 || 50–69
|-  style="text-align:center; background:#fbb;"
| 120 || August 19 || @ Mariners || 1–5 || Beavan (8–7) || Deduno (4–1) || Kinney (1) || 22,635 || 50–70
|-  style="text-align:center; background:#bfb;"
| 121 || August 20 || @ Athletics || 7–2 || Duensing (3–8) || McCarthy (6–5) || || 10,274 || 51–70
|-  style="text-align:center; background:#fbb;"
| 122 || August 21 || @ Athletics || 1–4 || Anderson (1–0) || De Vries (2–5) || Balfour (12) || 13,116 || 51–71
|-  style="text-align:center; background:#fbb;"
| 123 || August 22 || @ Athletics || 1–5 || Milone (10–9) || Hendriks (0–6) || || 16,657 || 51–72
|-  style="text-align:center; background:#fbb;"
| 124 || August 23 || @ Rangers || 6–10 || Adams (3–3) || Burton (1–1) || Nathan (25) || 33,762 || 51–73 
|-  style="text-align:center; background:#fbb;"
| 125 || August 24 || @ Rangers || 0–8 || Harrison (15–7) || Deduno (4–2) || || 45,823 || 51–74
|-  style="text-align:center; background:#fbb;"
| 126 || August 25 || @ Rangers || 3–9 || Dempster (8–6) || Duensing (3–9) || || 44,215 || 51–75
|-  style="text-align:center; background:#bfb;"
| 127 || August 26 || @ Rangers || 6–5 || De Vries (3–5) || Feldman (6–10) || Perkins (8) || 37,785 || 52–75
|-  style="text-align:center; background:#fbb;"
| 128 || August 27 || Mariners || 0–1 || Hernández (13–5) || Hendriks (0–7) || || 31,883 || 52–76
|-  style="text-align:center; background:#fbb;"
| 129 || August 28 || Mariners || 2–5 || Iwakuma (5–3) || Diamond (10–6) || Wilhelmsen (20) || 29,854 || 52–77
|-  style="text-align:center; background:#bfb;"
| 130 || August 29 || Mariners || 10–0 || Deduno (5–2) || Vargas (13–9) || || 29,281 || 53–77
|-  style="text-align:center; background:#fbb;"
| 131 || August 30 || Mariners || 4–5 || Beavan (9–8) || Duensing (3–10) || Wilhelmsen (21) || 32,578 || 53–78
|-  style="text-align:center; background:#bbb;"
|  || August 31 || @ Royals ||colspan=7| Postponed (rain). Makeup: 9/1
|-

|-  style="text-align:center; background:#bfb;"
| 132 || September 1 || @ Royals || 3–1 || De Vries (4–5) || Smith (4–7) || Perkins (9) || || 54–78
|-  style="text-align:center; background:#bfb;"
| 133 || September 1 || @ Royals || 8–7 || Swarzak (3–4) || Hochevar (7–13) || Perkins (10) || 23,189 || 55–78
|-  style="text-align:center; background:#fbb;"
| 134 || September 2 || @ Royals || 4–6 || Collins (5–2) || Vásquez (0–1) || Holland (10) || 23,641 || 55–79
|-  style="text-align:center; background:#fbb;"
| 135 || September 3 || @ White Sox || 2–4 || Santiago (3–1) || Deduno (5–3) || Reed (25) || 21,676 || 55–80
|-  style="text-align:center; background:#bfb;"
| 136 || September 4 || @ White Sox || 18–9 || Diamond (11–6) || Quintana (5–4) || || 15,698 || 56–80
|-  style="text-align:center; background:#fbb;"
| 137 || September 5 || @ White Sox || 2–6 || Peavy (10–10) || Walters (2–3) || || 17,336 || 56–81
|-  style="text-align:center; background:#fbb;"
| 138 || September 7 || Indians || 6–7 || Huff (1–0) || Robertson (1–2) || Perez (35) || 30,111 || 56–82
|-  style="text-align:center; background:#bfb;"
| 139 || September 8 || Indians || 3–0 || De Vries (5–5) || McAllister (5–7) || Perkins (11) || 33,698 || 57–82
|-  style="text-align:center; background:#bfb;"
| 140 || September 9 || Indians || 8–7 || Duensing (4–10) || Pestano (3–2) || || 30,219 || 58–82
|-  style="text-align:center; background:#bfb;"
| 141 || September 10 || Indians || 7–2 || Deduno (6–3) || Masterson (11–13) || || 27,526 || 59–82
|-  style="text-align:center; background:#fbb;"
| 142 || September 11 || Royals || 1–9 || Smith (5–7) || Diamond (11–7) || || 28,993 || 59–83
|-  style="text-align:center; background:#fbb;"
| 143 || September 12 || Royals || 5–10 || Hochevar (8–13) || Walters (2–4) || || 28,139 || 59–84
|-  style="text-align:center; background:#bfb;"
| 144 || September 13 || Royals || 4–3 (10) || Perkins (3–1) || Bueno (1–1) || || 28,669 || 60–84
|-  style="text-align:center; background:#fbb;"
| 145 || September 14 || White Sox || 0–6 || Sale (17–6) || Vásquez (0–2) || || 30,729 || 60–85
|-  style="text-align:center; background:#fbb;"
| 146 || September 15 || White Sox || 3–5 || Liriano (6–11) || Deduno (6–4) || Thornton (3) || 36,308 || 60–86
|-  style="text-align:center; background:#fbb;"
| 147 || September 16 || White Sox || 2–9 || Peavy (11–11) || Diamond (11–8) || || 31,722 || 60–87
|-  style="text-align:center; background:#bfb;"
| 148 || September 18 || @ Indians || 6–5 (12) || Robertson (2–2) || Maine (2–2) || Perkins (12) || 10,342 || 61–87
|-  style="text-align:center; background:#bfb;"
| 149 || September 19 || @ Indians || 6–4 || Hendriks (1–7) || McAllister (5–8) || Perkins (13) || 13,519 || 62–87
|-  style="text-align:center; background:#fbb;"
| 150 || September 20 || @ Indians || 3–4 (10) || Rogers (3–3) || Swarzak (3–5) || || 12,331 || 62–88
|-  style="text-align:center; background:#bbb;"
|     || September 21 || @ Tigers ||colspan=7|Postponed (rain); Makeup: 9/23
|-  style="text-align:center; background:#fbb;"
| 151 || September 22 || @ Tigers || 0–8 || Fister (10–9) || Deduno (6–5) || || 40,586 || 62–89
|-  style="text-align:center; background:#bfb;"
| 152 || September 23 || @ Tigers || 10–4 || Diamond (12–8) || Scherzer (16–7) || || 40,438 || 63–89
|-  style="text-align:center; background:#bfb;"
| 153 || September 23 || @ Tigers || 2–1 (10) || Burton (2–1) || Valverde (3–4) || Perkins (14) || 39,839 || 64–89
|-  style="text-align:center; background:#fbb;"
| 154 || September 24 || Yankees || 3–6 || Pettitte (5–3) || Hendriks (1–8) || || 33,720 || 64–90
|-  style="text-align:center; background:#bfb;"
| 155 || September 25 || Yankees || 5–4 || Fien (2–1) || Hughes (16–13) || Perkins (15) || 33,346 || 65–90
|-  style="text-align:center; background:#fbb;"
| 156 || September 26 || Yankees || 2–8 || Sabathia (14–6) || Duensing (4–11) || || 33,251 || 65–91
|-  style="text-align:center; background:#bfb;"
| 157 || September 28 || Tigers || 4–2 || Burton (3–1) || Villarreal (3–5) || Perkins (16) || 30,315 || 66–91
|-  style="text-align:center; background:#fbb;"
| 158 || September 29 || Tigers || 4–6 || Verlander (17–8) || Walters (2–5) || Valverde (33) || 32,839 || 66–92
|-  style="text-align:center; background:#fbb;"
| 159 || September 30 || Tigers || 1–2 || Coke (2–3) || Burton (3–2) || Valverde (34) || 32,554 || 66–93
|-  style="text-align:center; background:#fbb;"
| 160 || October 1 || @ Blue Jays || 5–6 (10) || Lyon (4–2) || Duensing (4–12) || || 12,359 || 66–94
|-  style="text-align:center; background:#fbb;"
| 161 || October 2 || @ Blue Jays || 3–4 || Jenkins (1–3) || Swarzak (3–6) || Janssen (22) || 13,930 || 66–95
|-  style="text-align:center; background:#fbb;"
| 162 || October 3 || @ Blue Jays || 1–2 || Morrow (10–7) || Diamond (12–9) || Lyon (1) || 19,769 || 66–96
|-

Roster

Player stats

Batting
Note: G = Games played; AB = At bats; R = Runs scored; H = Hits; 2B = Doubles; 3B = Triples; HR = Home runs; RBI = Runs batted in; AVG = Batting average; SB = Stolen bases

Pitching
Note: W = Wins; L = Losses; ERA = Earned run average; G = Games pitched; GS = Games started; SV = Saves; IP = Innings pitched; R = Runs allowed; ER = Earned runs allowed; BB = Walks allowed; SO = Strikeouts

Other post-season awards
Calvin R. Griffith Award (Most Valuable Twin) – Josh Willingham
Joseph W. Haynes Award (Twins Pitcher of the Year) – Scott Diamond
Bill Boni Award (Twins Outstanding Rookie) – Scott Diamond
Jim Kaat Award (Defensive Player of the Year) – Ben Revere
Charles O. Johnson Award (Most Improved Twin) – Ben Revere
Dick Siebert Award (Upper Midwest Player of the Year) – Joe Mauer
Bob Allison Award (Leadership Award) – Justin Morneau
Mike Augustin Award ("Media Good Guy" Award) – Glen Perkins
The above awards are voted on by the Twin Cities chapter of the BBWAA
Carl R. Pohlad Award (Outstanding Community Service) – Denard Span
Sherry Robertson Award (Twins Outstanding Farm System Position Player) – Oswaldo Arcia
Jim Rantz Award (Twins Outstanding Farm System Pitcher) – B. J. Hermsen
Kirby Puckett Award (Alumni Community Service) – Roy Smalley
Herb Carneal Award (Lifetime Achievement Award) – Jim Rantz

Farm system 

LEAGUE CHAMPIONS: Elizabethton

References

Minnesota Twins seasons
Minnesota Twins
2012 in sports in Minnesota

External links
2012 Minnesota Twins at Baseball Reference